Bhote Koshi in Nepal and Poiqu in Tibet, both names roughly mean "Tibetan river," is the name given to the upper course (main tributary) of the Sun Kosi river. It is part of the Koshi River system in Nepal.

Names and etymology
Bhotekoshi is the Nepalese name. In Nepali language, the word "bhoṭe" or "bhoṭiyā" means Tibetan; and the word "kosi" means river. As such the name is not unique, the western tributary of the upper Dudh Koshi is also called Bhote Koshi.

Poiqu is the common name for the river on the Chinese side. It is also transliterated as Boqu via Chinese. and as Po Chu by early 1990s Everest expeditions. This name means "River of Tibet." This is not a unique name, as it is also ascribed to Yarlung Tsangpo. The formal name of the river in Tibetan is Matsang Tsangpo.

River course

The headwaters of Poiqu and Bhote-Sun Koshi River are located at the Zhangzangbo Glacier in Tibet.
The river flows out of the Lumi Chimi lake. When entering Nepal, it is called Bhote Koshi. Further downstream, from the village of Bahrabise onwards, it is called Sun Koshi.

Hazards 
In July 1981, a sudden ice avalanche caused a Glacial Lake Outburst Flood in the moraine-dammed Zhangzangbu-Cho Lake in the headwaters of the Bhote Koshi. The ensuing debris flow destroyed bridges, and sections of both the Arniko and the Nepal–China highways.

Tourism and sports
The Bhote Kosi is used for both rafting and kayaking. It is the steepest river rafted in Nepal, with a gradient of 15 m per km. Bungee jumping or swinging over the Bhote Kosi has been described as the ‘ultimate experience’.

The river carves a steep and direct drop at the top that gradually eases to more placid streams and calmer pools with a 46-km run at the Lamosunga dam. The rapids are class IV-V at high flow, and III at lower levels.  The river is steep and continuous with one rapid leading into another.

References

External links
 Bhote Kosi River (Upper Sun Kosi), OpenStreetMap, retrieved 19 December 2021.
 Sun Kosi River, OpenStreetMap, retrieved 19 December 2021.
 Arun River, OpenStreetMap, retrieved 19 December 2021.
 Sapta Kosi River, OpenStreetMap, retrieved 19 December 2021.

Rivers of Tibet
Rivers of Bagmati Province
International rivers of Asia